The Civic and Social Front of Catamarca is a provincial political party in Argentina. 

The front was formed in 1991 by the Catamarcan branch of the Radical Civic Union and minor local parties. Since then it has held the governor's house in Catamarca, first with Arnoldo Castillo (1991-1999), then with his son Oscar Castillo (1999-2003), and then with Eduardo Brizuela del Moral.

Catamarca Province
Political parties established in 1991
Provincial political parties in Argentina
1991 establishments in Argentina
Radical Civic Union